The 1997–98 Dallas Stars season was the fifth National Hockey League season in Dallas, Texas (and 31st overall). The most notable aspect of the season was winning the Presidents' Trophy.

Offseason

Regular season

The Stars tied the Edmonton Oilers for most power-play goals scored, with 77, and had the best power-play percentage in the league, at 20.00%.

Final standings

Schedule and results

Playoffs

Player statistics

Regular season
Scoring

Goaltending

Playoffs
Scoring

Goaltending

Note: Pos = Position; GP = Games played; G = Goals; A = Assists; Pts = Points; +/- = plus/minus; PIM = Penalty minutes; PPG = Power-play goals; SHG = Short-handed goals; GWG = Game-winning goals
      MIN = Minutes played; W = Wins; L = Losses; T = Ties; GA = Goals-against; GAA = Goals-against average; SO = Shutouts; SA = Shots against; SV = Shots saved; SV% = Save percentage;

Awards and records
 Presidents' Trophy
 Neal Broten, Lester Patrick Trophy
 Jere Lehtinen, Frank J. Selke Trophy

Draft picks
Dallas's draft picks at the 1997 NHL Entry Draft held at the Civic Arena in Pittsburgh, Pennsylvania.

References
 Stars on Hockey Database

D
D
Dallas Stars seasons
Presidents' Trophy seasons